Steenstrup Glacier, is a glacier in NW Greenland. Administratively it belongs to the Avannaata municipality.

This glacier was named after Danish geologist and explorer of Greenland K. J. V. Steenstrup (1842 - 1913).

Geography 
The Steenstrup Glacier is the largest and widest glacier in the Lauge Koch Coast, Melville Bay. It originates in the western side of the Greenland ice sheet and flows westwards between the Dietrichson Glacier to the north and the Kjer Glacier to the south. Its terminus is just northeast of the Depot Islands and north of Red Head in the Melville Bay. The Kløftet Nunatak is located south, and the Kleinschmidt Nunatak rises on the northern side.

See also
List of glaciers in Greenland

References

External links
Steenstrup Glacier, NW Greenland Releases New Island in 2017
Warming, glacier melt and surface energy budget

Glaciers of Greenland